Bugha al-Sharabi ("Bugha the Cupbearer"), also known as Bugha al-Saghir ("Bugha the Younger") to distinguish him from his unrelated contemporary Bugha the Elder, was a senior Turkic military leader in the mid-9th century Abbasid Caliphate.

He served under Caliph al-Mutawakkil (r. 847–861) in Azerbaijan, but later led the conspiracy among the Turkic troops who killed the caliph. Closely allied to another Turkic officer, Wasif, Bugha held power at court under the caliphs al-Muntasir (r. 861–862) and al-Musta'in (r. 862–866), during the "Anarchy at Samarra". He fell into disgrace under al-Mu'tazz (r. 866–869), however, who resented both his influence and his role in the murder of al-Mutawakkil, his father. In 868, Bugha was imprisoned and executed at the Caliph's orders.

Sources 
 
 

868 deaths
9th-century Turkic people
Generals of the Abbasid Caliphate
Abbasid ghilman
Executed military personnel
9th-century executions by the Abbasid Caliphate
Year of birth unknown